Virgatites is an extinct genus of ammonoid cephalopod belonging to the family Perisphinctidae. Related genera in the Virgatitinae include Acuticostites and Zaraiskites. Species in this genus were fast-moving nektonic carnivores.

Species

 Virgatites virgatus (Buch 1830)
 Virgatites pallasianus (d'Orbigny, 1845)
 Virgatites sosia (Vischniakoff 1882)
 Virgatites larisae Mitta 1983
 Virgatites gerassimovi Mitta 1983
 Virgatites crassicostatus Mitta 1987
 Virgatites rarecostatus Rogov 2017

Description
Viratites has a ribbed evolute shell without tubercles.

Distribution 
These cephalopods lived during the Volgan stage (or Tithonian age) of the upper Jurassic in what is now the Russian Platform.

References

Further reading 
W.J Arkell, et al., Mesozoic Ammonoidea; Treatise  on Invertebrate Paleontology, Part L, 1957. Geological Society of America and University of Kansas Press.
V.V. Mitta, 1993. The Systematic Composition of the Middle Volgian Virgatitidae (Ammonoidea) of Central Asia Paleontological Journal 27(4).

Ammonitida genera
Perisphinctidae
Jurassic animals of Asia
Jurassic ammonites